The Centro Cultural Municipal Parque das Ruínas, or simply Parque das Ruínas (Ruins Park), is a public park with an art gallery built around the ruins of a mansion, located in the Santa Teresa neighborhood in Rio de Janeiro, Brazil. It is a venue for live outdoor concerts and houses a bar.

The site was the residence of Belle Époque art mecenas , who invited intellectuals and artists to her mansion in the early 20th century. In 1993, after 40 years of abandonment, Rio de Janeiro's state government purchased the site and organized an architectural contest. In 1997 the former hotel was transformed into a cultural center, designed after the winning project of architect Ernani Freire, who kept the structure of the ruins and added a contemporary look. Today the site offers a variety of cultural events.

The Parque das Ruínas offers a unique panoramic view of Rio de Janeiro, with a broad view of Guanabara Bay from one side and the Centro from the other side.

References

Culture in Rio de Janeiro (city)
Parks in Rio de Janeiro (city)
Belle Époque